Ysgol Gyfun Gŵyr is a Welsh language medium secondary school in Gowerton, Swansea, Wales, with approximately 950 pupils as of 2016.  It was established in 1984. Notable past students include footballer John Hartson, soprano Elin Manahan Thomas, Michelin Star Chef Paul Davies and UFC fighter Brett Johns.

In 2001 the school, as the only Welsh-speaking secondary school in Swansea, was encountering capacity problems, having to accommodate over 1,000 pupils in buildings that were designed for a capacity of 750. Proposals were made to move the school to the site of Penlan Comprehensive School, which was shortly to close. However parents and Staff protested against the move, resulting in a second Welsh-language school in Swansea (Ysgol Gyfun Gymraeg Bryn Tawe)

According to the latest inspection report from Estyn the school has a GCSE pass rate of 76% (based on 5 GCSEs, grades A-C), which puts it in 5th place in Wales or in the top 10%. In Swansea it is ranked 1st place for best school.

In 2007, Ysgol Gyfun Gŵyr introduced the Welsh Baccalaureate.

In 2015, the Rugby 1st XV won the Ospreys under 18s School League, beating Gowerton Comprehensive School 23–21.

See also
:Category:People educated at Ysgol Gyfun Gŵyr

References

External links
Parents protest over school site bbc.co.uk 28 June 2001
Ysgol Gyfun Gwyr Official School Website Official School Website

Secondary schools in Swansea
Educational institutions established in 1984
Welsh-language schools
1984 establishments in Wales